Pamela Jean Bileck-Flat (born December 1, 1968 in Pittsburgh) is a former gymnast. She competed for the United States national team at the 1984 Summer Olympics and won a silver medal in the team competition. She was also a member of the 1983 and 1985 World Championship teams.  Pam competed well at the 1985 Worlds, her final competition where she upgraded her difficulty on the floor and performed a double back for her second pass.

  She was inducted into the USA Gymnastics Hall of Fame in 2006.

References

1968 births
Living people
American female artistic gymnasts
Gymnasts at the 1984 Summer Olympics
Sportspeople from Pittsburgh
Sportspeople from Huntington Beach, California
Olympic silver medalists for the United States in gymnastics
Medalists at the 1984 Summer Olympics
U.S. women's national team gymnasts
21st-century American women